A by-election was held for the New South Wales Legislative Assembly electorate of West Sydney on 26 July 1890 because of the death of Alfred Lamb.

Dates

Candidates
 Adolphus Taylor was the editor of the Truth and had been the member for Mudgee from 1882 until 1887.
 John Taylor was a timber merchant who had been an alderman on the Sydney City Council since 1877 and before that an alderman and mayor of Balmain Council. He had unsuccessfully stood as a candidate for Balmain at the 1880, and 1882 elections.
 Peter Brennan was the president of the Trades and Labor Council and was its endorsed candidate, however he ultimately did not nominate after some of the maritime unions supported Adolphus Taylor.

Result

Alfred Lamb died.

See also
Electoral results for the district of West Sydney
List of New South Wales state by-elections

References

1890 elections in Australia
New South Wales state by-elections
1890s in New South Wales